The AJ6 (Advanced Jaguar 6-cylinder), and the similar AJ16, were inline-6 piston engines used by Jaguar cars in the 1980s and 1990s. The AJ6 was designed to replace the successful and long-used Jaguar XK6 engine, and was introduced in 1984. It was only the third all-new engine ever designed by the company. The AJ16 evolution was replaced in 1996 with the Jaguar developed AJ-V8 engine.

Jaguar had considered cutting their existing V12 in half to build a V6, or possibly a V8, but chose instead to develop a new inline six. The cylinders are inclined, as in a slant-6, by 22 degrees. It uses an aluminium block to reduce weight, and has an optional DOHC head for higher efficiency and power.

AJ6
The original engines were the DOHC 3.6 and the SOHC 2.9. The DOHC 3.6 was revised and enlarged to 4.0 in 1990. It is still essentially an "AJ6", however. This was, as per usual, offered for the XJ-S before it was built into the XJ40 saloon.

3.6
The  was the first AJ6 engine, debuting in 1983 on the XJ-S. It had DOHC 4-valve heads with a  bore and stroke. Early versions of the  AJ6 as used in the 1984 - 1987 XJ-S cars had a conventional distributor type of ignition system with electronics within the distributor body. This early AJ6 ignition system is nearly identical to the system used on the XK engine in the Series III XJ6 cars. The Lucas fuel injection system on the  AJ6 engines in these early XJ-S cars sensed engine load using a Manifold Absolute Pressure (MAP) sensor just like the V12 cars from the same era. Later  AJ6 engines as used in the 1986–1989 XJ40 cars had a crank-sensor type of ignition system with a bare distributor that only carried the spinning ignition rotor inside the distributor cap. The fuel-injection system used on the later  AJ6 engines used a hot-wire Mass Air Flow sensor to determine engine load.

Vehicles using the 3.6 were:
 1984–1989 Jaguar XJ-S
 1986–1989 Jaguar XJ6
 1986–1989 Jaguar XJ6 Sovereign
 1986–1989 Daimler

2.9

The  used a SOHC head from the Jaguar V12 engine, and was prone to failure. Only the 1986–1989 Jaguar XJ6 used the 2.9. It was used for the entry-level XJ6 in Britain and Europe but rarely, if ever, seen in models exported to the US. The SOHC 2.9, which was generally considered somewhat underpowered for such a large car, was discontinued in 1990 (Actually 3.2 starts with a J-plate, so late 90 2.9 is possible) and replaced with a DOHC 3.2 (essentially identical to the DOHC 4.0).

The 2.9 Engine was, as in earlier years the 2.8 XK-engine, sized to match road-tax regulations in some European Countries like Italy or France. In France cars with more than 3 litres of engine size had to pay a luxury tax.

Unlike all other AJ6's, the 2.9l used Bosch LH Jetronic fuel injection and EZ-K ignition (rather than Lucas 9 or 15CU EMS)

4.0 (1989–1994)

The 24-valve DOHC  version replaced the  AJ6 in 1989. The  engines as used in the 1990–1994 XJ40 cars continued with the crank sensor and empty distributor type of ignition system  and the hot-wire Mass Air Flow sensor type of fuel injection control system as the 1988–1989  XJ40 cars.

TWR modified XJ40s resulting in the XJR. Jaguarsport was also formed as a partnership between TWR and Jaguar. The first XJR, the XJR , had extensive appearance changes coupled with stiffer suspension, anti-roll bar/links, power steering valve that reduced efficiency by 40% and an LSD but no performance enhancements. Interior-wise it included special stitching, "sport" or "XJR" embossed front headrests, and Jaguarsport speedometer labels and tread-plates.

1990 XJRs had the upgraded 4L engine with the old style body-kits, and appearance changers.

XJR 4.0Ls from 1990 on had all of the XJR 3.6 handling upgrades and benefits from engine enhancements such as high lift cams, improved double plenum inlet manifold, and a compression ratio of 9.75:1. They were sent to TWR in Coventry to be modified directly after being produced.

The exterior changed again for the last generation of the XJ40 XJR (from H-registration year onwards). Bodykit was re-sculptured and the boot spoiler was deleted. Side mouldings were added, with the smaller "XJR" badge embedded in them. Engine had a plaque saying "Jaguarsport XJR 4L" on the rocker cover. XJR badge size was decreased on the boot (had previously ranged from XJR-3.6, XJR-4L, 4-litre and "XJR". The later one ("XJR") is most common and the only badge that could be chosen on the boot infill panel models. A "sport" one on the front within its own unique XJR grill. In this unique grill a "sport" badge was installed. Interior even had XJR specific wood (SPB part number).

Total XJ40 cars built was 208,733 and supposedly 500 JaguarSport cars built, 200 of the round headlight versions and then about 300 with the square headlights like the Sovereigns and Daimler's. 1990+ XJR power output is around  / .

3.2 (1990–1994)

Following the launch of the Aston Martin DB7, the Jaguar AJ6 was used by Aston Martin as well (both companies being owned by Ford at the time). This version featured an Eaton supercharger.

Cars using the 4.0 and 3.2 included:
 Jaguar XJS (4.0 only)
 Aston Martin DB7 (modified, supercharged 3.2)
 Jaguar XJ6
 Jaguar Sovereign
 Jaguar XJR (4.0 only)
 Daimler Six

AJ16
Both the 3.2 and 4.0 were substantially revised for the 1995 launch of the renewed Jaguar XJ (X300) saloon. These are the "AJ16" engines, both featuring coil-on-plug distributorless ignition, new engine management systems, magnesium alloy valve covers, revised pistons and other detail changes.  The AJ16 was discontinued with the launch of the AJ-V8 (XK8 and XJ8 in 1996/7).

4.0 / 3.2 (1994–1997)

The new design was called the AJ16 to reflect the major differences between it and the original AJ6.

Cars using the 4.0 and 3.2 included:
 Jaguar XJS (4.0 only)
 Jaguar XJ6
 Jaguar XJ6 Sovereign
 Jaguar XJ6 Sport
 Daimler

AJ16S

See also
 Jaguar XK6 engine
 Jaguar V12 engine
 Jaguar AJ-V6 engine

AJ6
Gasoline engines by model
Straight-six engines